White House Office is an entity within the Executive Office of the President of the United States (EOP). The White House Office is headed by the White House chief of staff, who is also the head of the Executive Office of the President. The staff work for and report directly to the president, including West Wing staff and the president's senior advisers. Almost all of the White House Office staff are political appointees of the president, do not require Senate confirmation and can be dismissed at the discretion of the president. Aside from Cabinet secretaries and Supreme Court justices, whose nominations require the approval of the Senate, the President of the United States has the authority to appoint people to high-level positions within the federal government unilaterally.

The staff of the various offices are based in the West Wing and East Wing of the White House, the Eisenhower Executive Office Building, and the New Executive Office Building. Senior staff, with high level, close contact with the President, have the title Assistant to the President. Second-level staff have the title Deputy Assistant to the President, and third-level staff have the title Special Assistant to the President. These aides oversee the political and policy interests of the president.

History 
The White House Office is organized in accordance with the wishes of each incumbent president and is directed by staff chosen by the president. A staff authorization was initially established in 1978 (92 Stat. 2445). Some presidential boards, committees, and commissions function organizationally as subunits of the White House Office.

Although still a subunit of the EOP, the White House Office remains the center of the presidential staff system. In many ways it is closest to the president both in physical proximity, its top aides occupy most of the offices in the West Wing, and in its impact on the day-to-day operations, deliberations, policy agendas, and public communications of a presidency. During the transition to office and continuing throughout an administration, the president enjoys a great deal of discretion in terms of how the White House Office is organized.

Mission 
The issues that confront the United States at any one time cannot be dealt with by the president alone, and therefore the president draws on the expertise of others in the administration and even within an administration as one chief of staff may differ from a predecessor or successor.

While chiefs of staff may differ in the degree of policy advice they provide a president, they are the managers of the White House staff system. At least in theory, they are the coordinators bringing the pieces together; they are the tone-setters and disciplinarians making for good organizational order, and often act as the gatekeeper for the president, overseeing every person, document and communication that goes to the president.

Organization 

Office of the Chief of Staff 
 Assistant to the President and White House Chief of Staff: Jeff Zients
 Special Assistant to the President and Senior Advisor to the Chief of Staff: Reema Shah
 Special Assistant to the President and Senior Advisor for Communications to the Chief of Staff: Vacant
 Adviser to the Chief of Staff: Nina Srivastava
 Assistant to the President and White House Deputy Chief of Staff: Jen O'Malley Dillon
 Special Assistant to the President and Senior Advisor to the Deputy Chief of Staff: Katie Fricchione
 Assistant to the President and White House Deputy Chief of Staff: Bruce Reed
 Special Assistant to the President and Senior Advisor to the Deputy Chief of Staff: Zayn Siddique
 Assistant to the President and White House Deputy Chief of Staff: Natalie Quillian

Senior Advisors & Counselor to the President 
 Assistant to the President and Senior Advisor: Mike Donilon
 Assistant to the President and Senior Advisor: Anita Dunn
Special Assistant to the President & Chief of Staff to the Senior Advisor: Jordan Finkelstein 
 Assistant to the President and Senior Advisor for American Rescue Plan Coordination: Gene Sperling
 Assistant to the President and Senior Advisor for Health Care Policy & U.S. Digital Service: Neera Tanden
 Assistant to the President and Senior Advisor for Public Engagement: Keisha Lance Bottoms
 Assistant to the President and Senior Advisor for Intergovernmental Relations: Julie Rodriguez
 Assistant to the President and Senior Advisor for Infrastructure Coordination: Mitch Landrieu
Special Assistant to the President & Deputy Infrastructure Implementation Coordinator: Samantha Silverberg
Special Assistant to the President & Deputy Infrastructure Implementation Coordinator for Implementation Management: Asma Mirza
 Assistant to the President and Senior Advisor for Clean Energy Innovation & Implementation: John Podesta 
 Assistant to the President and Counselor to the President: Steve Ricchetti
 Special Assistant to the President and Senior Advisor to the Counselor to the President: John McCarthy

COVID-19 Response Team 
 Assistant to the President & Coordinator of the COVID-19 response: Dr. Ashish Jha
Chief of Staff for the COVID-19 Response: Mary Wall 
Advisor to the Coordinator Of The COVID-19 Response: Noe Gonzalez
Deputy Coordinator of the COVID-19 Response: Lisa Barclay
Advisor to the Deputy Coordinator Of The COVID-19 Response: Grace Kwak
Chief Science Officer of COVID Response: David A. Kessler
Special Counsel: Abbe Gluck
Director of Intergovernmental Affairs: Eduardo Cisneros
Director of Strategic Communications and Engagement: Dorinda Salkido
Deputy Director of Strategic Communications and Engagement: Subhan Cheema
Digital Director: Marissa Sanchez-Velasco
Data Director: Dr. Cyrus Shahpar 
Advisor to the COVID-19 Data Director: Hannah Jarman-Miller
Director of Economic Policy and Budget: Charles Anderson
Director of Strategic Operations and Policy: Sam Berger
Vaccinations Coordinator: Vacant
Testing Coordinator: Carole Johnson (health official)
Policy Advisor for Testing: Vidur Sharma
Supply Coordinator: Tim Manning
Senior Policy Advisor, COVID-19 Response: Sujeet Rao
Policy Advisor, COVID-19 Response: Machmud Makhmudov
Senior Advisor for Tech & Delivery, COVID-19 Response: Becca Siegel

Domestic Policy Council 
 Assistant to the President and Director of the Domestic Policy Council: Susan Rice
Deputy Assistant to the President and Senior Advisor to the Director: Stefanie Feldman
Special Assistant to the President and Chief of Staff for the Domestic Policy Council: Erin Pelton
Deputy Chief of Staff and Senior Policy Analyst for the Domestic Policy Council: Priya Singh
 Special Assistant to the President and Executive Secretary for the Domestic Policy Council: Alex Yudelson
Deputy Executive Secretary for the Domestic Policy Council: 
Special Assistant to the President and Senior Policy Advisor for the Domestic Policy Council: Alex Pascal 
Speechwriter And Communications Advisor For The Domestic Policy Council: Zev Karlin-Neumann
Deputy Assistant to the President and Deputy Director of the Domestic Policy Council for Racial Justice & Equity: Chiraag Bains
Deputy Assistant to the President and Deputy Director of the Domestic Policy Council for Economic Mobility: Carmel Martin
 Deputy Assistant to the President and Deputy Director of the Domestic Policy Council for Health & Veterans Affairs: Christen Linke Young
Special Assistant for Health and Veterans and Immigration: Shreeya Panigrahi
Senior Policy Advisor for Medicare: Tiffany Swygert
 Deputy Assistant to the President and Deputy Director of the Domestic Policy Council for Immigration: Elizabeth Lawrence
Special Assistant to the President for Immigration: Leidy Perez-Davis
Special Assistant to the President for Domestic Policy for Immigration: Lise Clavel
Policy Advisor for Immigration: Molly Groom
Policy Advisor for Immigration: Eric Johnson
Policy Advisor for Immigration: Maura Ooi
Policy Advisor for Immigration: Erin Oshiro
Special Assistant to the President for Racial Justice & Equity and Economic Mobility: Elizabeth A. Brown
 Special Assistant to the President for Criminal Justice: Chiraag Bains
 Special Assistant to the President for Agriculture and Rural Policy: Kelliann Blazek
Senior Policy Advisor for Agriculture: Patricia Kovacs
 Special Assistant to the President for Labor and Workers: Pronita Gupta
Director for Labor and Workers: Grace Landrieu
Director for Labor Engagement: Erika Dinkel-Smith
Special Assistant to the President for Community Public Health and Disparities: Catherine Oakar
Special Assistant to the President for Public Health and Science: Dr. Sandra Elizabeth Ford
 Special Assistant to the President for Housing and Urban Policy: Erika Poethig
Policy Advisor for Housing and Urban Policy: Aaron Shroyer
 Special Assistant to the President for Racial and Economic Justice: VACANT
Director of Racial and Economic Justice: Chad Maisel
Director of Racial and Economic Justice: Jamie Keene
Special Assistant to the President for Veterans Affairs: Terri Tanielian
 Special Assistant to the President for Education: Maureen Tracey-Mooney
Director for Higher Education: Katherine Valle
 Special Assistant to the President for Democracy and Civic Participation: Justin Vail
Senior Policy Advisor for Democracy and Voting Rights: Justin Levitt
 Special Assistant to the President for Native Affairs: Libby Washburn
Policy Advisor for Native Affairs: Tracy Goodluck
Director for Disability Policy: Kim Knackstedt
 Office of National AIDS Policy
 Office of Faith-based and Neighborhood Partnerships
Special Assistant to the President & Director for Faith and Public Policy: Melissa Rogers
Deputy Director: Josh Dickson
Advisor to the Office of Faith-based and Neighborhood Partnerships: Benjamin O'Dell
Office of Social Innovation and Civic Participation

Office of Domestic Climate Policy 
 Assistant to the President & White House National Climate Advisor: Ali Zaidi 
 Chief of Staff for the Office of Domestic Climate Policy: Maggie Thomas 
 Deputy Assistant to the President & Deputy National Climate Advisor: TBC
 Special Assistant to the President for Climate Policy: David Hayes
 Special Assistant to the President for Climate Policy: John Rhodes
 Special Assistant to the President for Climate Finance: Clare Sierawski 
 Special Assistant to the President for Climate Policy and Finance: Jahi Wise 
 Senior Advisor for Climate Policy, Innovation & Development: Sonia Aggarwal
 Senior Advisor for Climate Resilience and Adaptation: Krystal Laymon
 Senior Advisor for Clean Energy Infrastructure: Robert Golden
 Senior Advisor for Climate Policy: Nick Conger
 Senior Director for Industrial Emissions: Trisha Miller
 Senior Director for Transportation Emissions: Austin Brown

National Economic Council 
 Assistant to the President and Director of the National Economic Council: Lael Brainard
Special Assistant to the President and Chief of Staff for the National Economic Council: Leandra English
Special Assistant to the Director of the National Economic Council: Caitlin Meloski
Senior Communications Advisor to the National Economic Council: Jesse Lee 
 Deputy Assistant to the President and Deputy Director of the National Economic Council: Aviva Aron-Dine
 Deputy Assistant to the President and Deputy Director of the National Economic Council: Joelle Gamble
Senior Policy Advisor for Domestic Competitiveness: Nell Abernathy
 Deputy Assistant to the President, Deputy Director of the National Economic Council and Deputy National Security Advisor for International Economics: Mike Pyle 
 Deputy Assistant to the President and Deputy Director of the National Economic Council for Labor and Economy: Celeste Drake
 Deputy Assistant to the President and Deputy Director of the National Economic Council and Advisor for Strategic Economic Communication: Bharat Ramamurti
 Special Assistant to the President for Budget and Tax Policy: Nadiya Beckwith-Stanley
 Special Assistant to the President for Economic Policy: Vacant
 Special Assistant to the President for Economic Policy: Daniel Hornung
 Special Assistant to the President for Manufacturing and Economic Development: Elisabeth Reynolds
 Special Assistant to the President for Transportation and Infrastructure Policy: Samantha Silveerberg 
Senior Policy Advisor for Broadband: Elizabeth Hone
 Special Assistant to the President for Technology and Competition Policy: Tim Wu
 Special Assistant to the President and Senior Director for International Economics and Competitiveness: Peter Harrell
 Special Assistant to the President and Senior Director for International Economics and Labor: Jennifer M. Harris
Senior Policy Advisor for Small Business: Michael Negron
 Senior Policy Advisor: Vivek Viswanathan
 Director for Global Engagement and Multilateral Diplomacy at the NSC and NEC: Andy Rabens
 White House Coordinator for CHIPS Implementation: Ronnie Chatterji

Office of Cabinet Affairs 
 Deputy Assistant to the President and Cabinet Secretary: Evan Ryan
Special Assistant to the President and Deputy Cabinet Secretary: Nik Blosser
Associate Director for Cabinet Affairs & Senior Advisor to the Cabinet Secretary: Thomas Isen 
Associate Director for Cabinet Affairs: Sanam Rastegar

Office of Communications 
 Assistant to the President & White House Director of Communications: Ben LaBolt
Chief of Staff for the Office of Communications: Khanya Brann
 Deputy Assistant to the President & Principal Deputy Director of Communications: Kate Berner
 Special Assistant to the President & Deputy Director of Communications: Herbie Ziskend
 Special Assistant to the President & Deputy Director of Communications: Jennifer Molina
 Director of Broadcast Media: Lucas Acosta
 Senior Director of Coalitions Media: TBC
Director of African-American Media: Erica P. Loewe
Director of Hispanic Media: Luisana Pérez Fernández
Director of Message Planning: Vacant
Director of Rapid Response: Vacant
Director of Research: Terry Moynihan 
Deputy Director of Research: Todd Zubatkin 
Senior Director of Regional Communications: Rykia Dorsey Craig
Director of Regional Communications: Haris Talwar 
 Director of Regional Communications: Seth Schuster
 Director of Regional Communications: Dhara Nayyar

Office of the Press Secretary
Assistant to the President and Press Secretary: Karine Jean-Pierre
Chief of Staff for the Press Office and Assistant to the Press Secretary: TBC
Deputy Assistant to the President and Principal Deputy Press Secretary: Olivia Dalton 
Special Assistant to the President and Deputy Press Secretary and Senior Communications Adviser for Strategic Response: Andrew Bates
Special Assistant to the President and Deputy Press Secretary: Emily Simons 
Assistant Press Secretary: Alexandra LaManna 
Assistant Press Secretary: Abdullah Hasan
Assistant Press Secretary: Michael Kikukawa
Assistant Press Secretary: Robyn Patterson
Press Assistant: Natalie Austin
Press Assistant: Allyson Bayless 
Press Assistant: Asjia Garner 
Press Assistant: Angela Perez

Office of Speechwriting
Assistant to the President and Director of Speechwriting: Vinay Reddy
Special Assistant to the President & Senior Presidential Speechwriter: Daniel Cluchey
Special Assistant to the President & Senior Presidential Speechwriter: Amber Macdonald
Special Assistant to the President & Senior Presidential Speechwriter: Brenda Jones
Special Assistant to the President & Senior Presidential Speechwriter: Megan Rooney

Office of Digital Strategy 
 Deputy Assistant to the President & Director of Digital Strategy: Rob Flaherty
Chief of Staff for the Office of Digital Strategy: Hoor Quareshi
 Special Assistant to the President & Deputy Director of Digital Strategy: Christian Tom
 Director of Partnerships: Landon Morgado
 Director of Platforms: Angela Krasnick
 Director of Digital Engagement: Cameron Trimble
 Director of Digital Response: Kyle James
 Creative Director: Meena Yi
 Traveling Content Director: Olivia Raisner
 Video Director: Jonathan Hebert
Video Editor: Eric Bravo
Senior Video Producer: Jenna Sumar
Video Producer: Melanie Duran
Video Producer: Joy Ngugi
Presidential Videographer: Drew Heskett

Office of the First Lady 
 Assistant to the President and Chief of Staff to the First Lady: VACANT
 Special Assistant to the Chief of Staff to the First Lady: Colby Redmond
 Assistant to the President and Senior Advisor to the First Lady: Anthony Bernal
 Deputy Assistant to the President and Policy & Projects Director for the First Lady: Mala Adiga
 Deputy Policy Director: Vanessa Lion
Associate Policy Director: John Scanlon
Deputy Associate Policy Director: Nicole Jackson
 Special Assistant to the President and Director of Scheduling & Advance for the First Lady: Gina Lee
 Special Assistant to the President and Trip Director for the First Lady: Jordan Montoya
Associate Director for Scheduling: John Moylan
Special Assistant for Scheduling and Advance: Marty Browne
 Deputy Assistant to the President and Communications Director to the First Lady: Elizabeth Alexander
 Deputy Communications Director to the First Lady: Kelsey Donohue
 Special Assistant to the President and Press Secretary to the First Lady: Vanessa Valdivia 
 Digital Director: VACANT
 Communications Co-ordinator: Asjia Garner 
 Deputy Assistant to the President and White House Social Secretary: Carlos Elizondo
Special Assistant to the Social Secretary and Events Coordinator: Manuelita Duran
Special Assistant to the President and Deputy Social Secretary: David Nurnberg
Associate Director, Office of the Social Secretary: Jeannie Rangel
Deputy Associate Director, Office of the Social Secretary: Shannon Ricchetti
Special Assistant to the President and Executive Director of Joining Forces: Rory Brosius

Gender Policy Council 
 Assistant to the President for Gender Policy & Director of the Gender Policy Council: Jennifer Klein
Chief of Staff and Policy Advisor for the Gender Policy Council: Lina Volin 
Special Assistant to the President for Gender Policy & Deputy Director: Shilpa Phadke
Special Assistant to the President for Gender Policy and Senior Advisor on Gender-Based Violence: Rosie Hidalgo
Special Assistant to the President for Gender Policy: Kalisha Dessources Figures

Office of Intergovernmental Affairs 
 Assistant to the President and Senior Advisor & Director of the Office of Intergovernmental Affairs: Julie Rodriguez
Chief of Staff for the Office of Intergovernmental Affairs: Alexandra Sopko
Special Assistant to the President and Deputy Director of Intergovernmental Affairs: Gabe Amo
Special Assistant to the President and Senior Advisor for Governors: Kathleen Marshall
Senior Advisor for Economic Recovery: Lukas McGowan
Senior Advisor and Tribal Affairs Director: PaaWee Rivera
Associate Director of Intergovernmental Affairs: Gabe Uy
Associate Director of Intergovernmental Affairs: Evan Wessel
Associate Director of Intergovernmental Affairs: Morgan Mohr
Associate Director for Puerto Rico and the Territories: Gretchen Sierra-Zorita
Policy Advisor for Intergovernmental Affairs: Katherine Pantangco
Senior Policy Analyst: Nezly Silva
Director of Intergovernmental Affairs for COVID-19: Eduardo Cisneros
Director of Intergovernmental Affairs for Infrastructure Implementation: Stephanie Sykes

Office of Legislative Affairs 
 Assistant to the President and Director of the Office of Legislative Affairs: Louisa Terrell
Special Assistant to the President and Chief of Staff for the Office of Legislative Affairs: TBC
Special Assistant to the Director of the Office Of Legislative Affairs: Jordan Morales
 Deputy Assistant to the President and Deputy Director of the Office of Legislative Affairs: Chris Slevin
 Deputy Assistant to the President and Deputy Director of the Office of Legislative Affairs, House Liaison: Shuwanza Goff
Special Assistant to the President and House Legislative Affairs Liaison: Ashley Jones
 Special Assistant to the President and House Legislative Affairs Liaison: Alicia Molt-West
Special Assistant to the President and House Legislative Affairs Liaison: Justin Oswald
 Special Assistant to the President and House Legislative Affairs Liaison: Angela Ramirez
 Special Assistant to the President and House Legislative Affairs Liaison: Lee Slater
 Deputy Assistant to the President and Deputy Director of the Office of Legislative Affairs, Senate Liaison: Reema Dodin
Special Assistant to the President and Senate Legislative Affairs Liaison: Zephranie Buetow
 Special Assistant to the President and Senate Legislative Affairs Liaison: Jonathan Black
 Special Assistant to the President and Senate Legislative Affairs Liaison: Elizabeth Jurinka
 Special Assistant to the President and Senate Legislative Affairs Liaison: Chad Metzler
 Special Assistant to the President and Director of Confirmations: Jim Secreto
Associate Director of Confirmations: Myles Mann
Senior Advisor for Congressional Engagement, Office of Legislative Affairs: Jessica Vallejo
Senior Legislative Affairs Advisor: Dana Shubat

Office of Management and Administration 
 Assistant to the President and Director of Management and Administration & Director of the Office of Administration: Dave Noble
Chief of Staff for the Office of the Management and Administration: Frances Dougherty 
Office of Administration
Special Assistant to the President and Deputy Director, Office of Administration: Sarah Feldmann
Associate Director of Management and Administration and the Office of Administration: Gevin Reynolds
General Counsel for the Office of Administration: vacant
Special Assistant to the President & Deputy Director of Management and Administration for Operations: Dana Rosenzweig
Director of COVID-19 Operations: Jeffrey Wexler
White House Personnel
Deputy Director of Management and Administration for Personnel: Christian Peele
Deputy Director of White House Personnel: Dalmyra P. Caesar
Special Assistant to the President & Chief Diversity and Inclusion Director: Michael Leach
White House Photo Office
Chief Official White House Photographer: Adam Schultz
Deputy Director of Photography: Chandler West
White House Management Office
Director of Finance: vacant
Deputy Director of Finance: Kathleen Hoang
White House Switchboard
White House Visitors Office
Director, White House Visitors Office: Carroll W Skinner 
Deputy Director, White House Visitors Office: Candace Johnson
White House Office of Technology
Special Assistant to the President & Director of Technology: Austin Lin
Deputy Director of Technology: Marcela Escobar-Alava
Senior Associate Director of Technology: Cory Slocum
Associate Director, Technology & Operations: Jack Welty

Office of the National Security Advisor 
 Assistant to the President and National Security Advisor: Jake Sullivan
 Assistant to the President and Principal Deputy National Security Advisor: Jonathan Finer
 Assistant to the President and Homeland Security Advisor and Deputy National Security Advisor: Elizabeth Sherwood-Randall
 Deputy Assistant to the President & Deputy National Security Advisor for Cyber and Emerging Technology: Anne Neuberger
 Deputy Assistant to the President, Deputy Director of the National Economic Council and Deputy National Security Advisor for International Economics: Mike Pyle   
 Assistant to the President, Deputy Counsel to the President and National Security Council Legal Advisor: John R. Phillips III

Office of Political Strategy and Outreach
 Assistant to the President and Director of Political Strategy & Outreach: Emmy Ruiz
Chief of Staff for the Office of Political Strategy And Outreach: Rachel Chiu
Special Assistant to the President & Deputy Director of Strategy & Outreach: Alana Mounce
Associate Director of Strategy & Outreach: Aleigha Cavalier
Special Assistant to the President & Director of Strategic Planning: Carla Frank
Associate Director for Strategic Planning: Katherine Bauer
Director of Strategic Outreach: Natalie Montelongo

Office of Presidential Personnel 
 Assistant to the President and Director of Presidential Personnel: Gautam Raghavan
Special Assistant to the President and Chief of Staff for the Office of Presidential Personnel: Stacy Eichner
Deputy Assistant to the President & Deputy Director of Presidential Personnel: Katie Petrelius
Senior Associate Director of Presidential Personnel: Allison Wong
Senior Associate Director of Presidential Personnel: Atissa Ladjevardian
Associate Director of Presidential Personnel: Rayshawn Dyson
Associate Director of Presidential Personnel: Destine Hicks
Associate Director of White House Personnel: Madalyn Tomaszewski
 Special Assistant to the President for Climate and Science Agency Personnel: Jeff Marootian
 Special Assistant to the President for Domestic Agency Personnel: Ruben Gonzales
Special Assistant to the President for Economic Agency Personnel: Linda Shim
Special Assistant to the President for Leadership Development and Appointee Engagement: Vanessa Millones
 Special Assistant to the President for National Security Agency Personnel: David White 
Special Assistant to the President for Personnel Strategy and Operations: TBC
Special Assistant to the President for Presidential Boards and Commissions: Meredith Jachowicz
Senior Associate Director for Presidential Boards and Commissions: Katie Hendrickson
Research Lead, Office of Presidential Personnel: Will Rusche
Associate Counsel for The Office Of Presidential Personnel: Nicholas Wunders
Deputy Associate Counsel for The Office Of Presidential Personnel: Katherine Bies
Deputy Associate Counsel for The Office Of Presidential Personnel: Conisha Hackett
Deputy Associate Counsel for The Office Of Presidential Personnel: David Manners-Weber
Deputy Associate Counsel for The Office Of Presidential Personnel: Helen Murillo
Deputy Associate Counsel for The Office Of Presidential Personnel: Bradley Pough
Deputy Associate Counsel for The Office Of Presidential Personnel: Sarah Scheinman
Deputy Associate Counsel for The Office Of Presidential Personnel: David E. White Jr.
Deputy Associate Counsel for The Office Of Presidential Personnel: Leah Wong
Deputy Associate Counsel and Senior Tax Counsel for The Office Of Presidential Personnel: Andrew Strelka
Deputy Associate Counsel and Senior Tax Counsel for The Office Of Presidential Personnel: Shamik Trivedi
Deputy Associate Counsel and Tax Counsel for The Office Of Presidential Personnel: Jordan Orosz
Security Clearance Counsel for The Office Of Presidential Personnel: Jamie L. Jackson

Office of Public Engagement 
 Assistant to the President and Senior Advisor for Public Engagement & and Director of the Office of Public Engagement: Keisha Lance Bottoms
Special Assistant to the Senior Advisor to the President and Director of the Office of Public Engagement: Nia Page
Special Assistant to the President and Principal Deputy Director of the Office of Public Engagement: Jamie Citron
Special Assistant to the President and Deputy Director of the Office of Public Engagement: Tara Murray
Associate Director of the Office of Public Engagement for Young People and LGBTQI+: Hannah Bristol
Associate Director of the Office of Public Engagement: Will McIntee
Associate Director of the Office of Public Engagement: Howard Ou
Associate Director of the Office of Public Engagement for Disability Community Engagement: Emily Voorde
Senior Advisor, Office of Public Engagement: Ernesto Apreza
Senior Advisor, Office of Public Engagement: Trey Baker
Senior Advisor, Office of Public Engagement: Joshua Dickson
Senior Advisor, Office of Public Engagement: Carissa J. Smith
 Deputy Assistant to the President and Asian American and Pacific Islander (AAPI) Senior Liaison: Erika L. Moritsugu
Special Assistant to the President and Director of Partnerships, Office of Public Engagement: Nathaly Arriola Maurice
Director of Private Sector Engagement: Zach Butterworth
Director of Labor Engagement: Erika Dinkel-Smith
Director of Veterans Engagement: James Anderson 
 Council on Women and Girls
 Office of Urban Affairs, Justice and Opportunity

Office of Scheduling and Advance
 Deputy Assistant to the President and Director of Scheduling and Advance: Ryan Montoya
Special Assistant to the President & Director of Presidential Scheduling: Araz Pourmorad
Associate Director of Presidential Scheduling: Alyssa Giammarella
Associate Director of Presidential Scheduling: Melissa Picolli
 Special Assistant to the President & Director of Presidential Advance: Connolly J. Keigher
Deputy Director of Presidential Advance: Jaclyn S. Gelfond
Associate Director of Presidential Advance: Noreen Kassam
Associate Director of Presidential Advance and Director Of Production For Presidential Events: Ian Mellul
Advance Coordinator: Amelia Berger
Advance Associate: Isabella Bugatti
Advance Associate: Brendan Jackson
Advance Associate: Patrick Maddox
Special Assistant to the President and Trip Director: Travis Dredd

Office of the Staff Secretary 
 Assistant to the President and Staff Secretary: Neera Tanden
Chief of Staff for the Office of the Staff Secretary: Chris Farley
 Special Assistant to the President and Deputy Staff Secretary: Michael Hochman
Associate Staff Secretary: Danielle Shulkin 
Associate Staff Secretary: Susan Wang 
Associate Staff Secretary: Joshua Schenk
Assistant Staff Secretary: Lucy Moore

Office of Presidential Correspondence 
Director of Presidential Correspondence: Garrett Lamm 
Deputy Director of Presidential Correspondence: Courtney Corbisiero 
Deputy Director of Presidential Correspondence: Garrett Lamm
Digital Analyst: Rebecca Brubaker

Office of the Executive Clerk 
Executive Clerk: David E. Kalbaugh
Assistant Executive Clerk: Brian Pate
Assistant Executive Clerk: Edwin R. Thomas III
Assistant to the Executive Clerk: Wanda Neiman
Assistant to the Executive Clerk: Mariel Ridgway
Assistant to the Executive Clerk: Kaitlyn Roberts
Assistant to the Executive Clerk: Sherman Williams

Office of Records Management 
Director of Records Management: Philip Droege
Deputy Director and Senior Advisor for Records Management: Paul S. Raizk
Supervisor for Records Management: Mary Brooke
Supervisor for Records Management: Vy Hoang
Supervisor for Records Management: Matthew Law
Supervisor for Records Management: Elizabeth Varghese
Assistant Supervisor for Records Management: Chad Millison
Assistant Supervisor for Records Management: Colleen Moran
Senior Records Management Analyst: Taeshonnda King
Senior Records Management Analyst: Caroline Poese
Records Management Analyst: Patricia Blount
Records Management Analyst: Rebekah Denz
Records Management Analyst: Karl Freeman II
Records Management Analyst: Jennifer Fischer
Records Management Analyst: Gregory Foster
Records Management Analyst: Abby Gipe
Records Management Analyst: Mu Ping Wang

Office of the White House Counsel 
Leadership:
 Assistant to the President and Counsel to the President: Stuart Delery
Chief of Staff to the White House Counsel: Jennifer Sokoler
Deputy Chief of Staff to the White House Counsel: Caroline Saba
Special Assistant to the White House Counsel: Katie Reilly
Special Assistant to the President and Spokesperson for the White House Counsel's Office: Ian Sams
Assistant to the President and Deputy Counsel to the President and National Security Council Legal Advisor: John R. Phillips III
Special Assistant to the President, Associate Counsel and Deputy Legal Advisor to the National Security Council: Ashley Deeks
Deputy Counsels to the President:
Deputy Assistant to the President and Deputy Counsel to the President: Danielle Conley
Deputy Assistant to the President and Deputy Counsel to the President: Jonathan Su
Deputy Assistant to the President and Deputy Counsel to the President: Stacey Grigsby 
Special Assistant to the Deputy White House Counsels: Devontae Freeland
Associate Counsels to the President:
Special Assistant to the President and Associate Counsel to the President: Funmi Olorunnipa Badejo
Special Assistant to the President and Associate Counsel to the President: Megan Ceronsky
Special Assistant to the President and Associate Counsel to the President: Martine Cicconi
Special Assistant to the President and Associate Counsel to the President: Sean Crotty
Special Assistant to the President and Associate Counsel to the President: Neha Gupta
Special Assistant to the President and Associate Counsel to the President: Janet Kim
Special Assistant to the President and Associate Counsel to the President: Lauren Moore
Special Assistant to the President and Associate Counsel to the President: Michael Posada
Special Assistant to the President and Associate Counsel to the President: Maury Riggan
Special Assistant to the President and Associate Counsel to the President: Larry Schwartztol
Special Assistant to the President and Associate Counsel to the President: Jennifer Sokoler
Special Assistant to the President and Associate Counsel to the President: Erica Knievel Songer
Associate Counsel to the President (detailee): Katie Raut
Deputy Associate Counsels to the President:
Deputy Associate Counsel to the President: Samiyyah Ali
Deputy Associate Counsel to the President: Justin Dews
Deputy Associate Counsel to the President: Ephraim McDowell
Deputy Associate Counsel to the President: Jaimie McFarlin
Deputy Associate Counsel to the President: Reema Shah
Specialized Counsels to the President:
Special Assistant to the President and Special Counsel to the President: Tona Boyd
Special Assistant to the President and Senior Counsel to the President: Paige Herwig
Ethics Counsel: Osasumwen Dorsey
Senior Advisers for the Office of the White House Counsel:
Senior Adviser, Office of the White House Counsel: Michael Czin 
Senior Adviser, Office of the White House Counsel: Caroline Saba

Oval Office Operations 
 Assistant to the President and Director of Oval Office Operations: Annie Tomasini
 Special Assistant to the President & Deputy Director of Oval Office Operations: Ashley Williams 
Special Assistant for Oval Office Operations: Aditi Somani 
 Special Assistant to the President & Personal Aide to the President: Stephen Goepfert

White House Fellows 
 Director, President's Commission on White House Fellowships: Rose Vela

White House Military Office 
 Deputy Assistant to the President & Director of the White House Military Office: TBA
 Special Assistant to the President & Deputy Director of the White House Military Office for Operations: Bradley Hoagland
 White House Communications Agency (Joint Services Unit)
 89th Airlift Wing (United States Air Force)
 White House Medical Unit (United States Navy)
 Deputy Assistant and Physician to the President: Kevin O'Conner
 Camp David (United States Navy & United States Marine Corps)
 Marine Helicopter Squadron One (United States Marine Corps)
 White House Mess or Presidential Food Service (United States Navy)
 White House Transportation Agency (United States Army)
 General Counsel

Notes

References 

 
Executive Office of the President of the United States
Presidency of the United States
1857 establishments in Washington, D.C.